Stefan Schärer (born 26 January 1965) is a Swiss handball player. He competed in the men's tournament at the 1996 Summer Olympics.

References

1965 births
Living people
Swiss male handball players
Olympic handball players of Switzerland
Handball players at the 1996 Summer Olympics
Place of birth missing (living people)